Aithihyamala or Ithihyamala (Garland of Legends) is a collection of century-old stories from Kerala that cover a vast spectrum of life, famous persons and events. It is a collection of legends numbering over a hundred, about magicians and yakshis, feudal rulers and conceited poets, kalari or Kalaripayattu experts, practitioners of Ayurveda and courtiers; elephants and their mahouts, tantric experts.

Kottarathil Sankunni (23 March 1855 – 22 July 1937), a Sanskrit-Malayalam scholar who was born in Kottayam in present-day Kerala, started documenting these stories in 1909. They were published in the Malayalam literary magazine, the Bhashaposhini, and were collected in eight volumes and published in the early 20th century.

It includes popular tales such as about the twelve children of Vararuchi and Parayi (a woman of Paraiyar caste), Kayamkulam Kochunni, Kadamattathu Kathanar among many others. The story of 12 children is popularly known as Parayi petta panthirukulam.

Index of Eight Parts
Book I

 1. Chempakassery Raajaavu 
 2. Kottayaththu Raajaavu
 3. Mahaabhaashyam 
 4. Bhartṛhari
 5. Adhyaathmaraamaayanam 
 6. Parayi petta panthirukulam
 7. Thalakkulaththoor Bhattathiriyum Pazhur padippurayum 
 8. Vilwamangalaththu Swaamiyaar 
 9. Kaakkassery Bhattathiri  
 10. Muttassu Namboothiri  
 11. Puliyaampilly Namboori 
 12. Kallanthaattil Gurukkal  
 13. Kolaththiriyum Saamoothiriyum  
 14. Paandamparampaththu kodanbharaniyilaey uppumaanga 
 15. Mangalappilly Moothathum Punnayil Panikkarum
 16. Kaaladiyil Bhattathiri
 17. Venmani Namboorippaadanmaar
 18. Kunchamanpottiyum Mattappally Namboothirippaadum
 19. Vayakkara Achchan Mooss
 20. Kozhikkottangaadi
 21. Kidangoor Kandankoran

Book II 

 1. Kumaranalloor Bhagavathi
 2. Thirunakkara Devanum aviduththaey kaalayum
 3. Bhavabhoothi
 4. Vaagbhataachaaryar
 5. Prabhakaran
 6. Paathaayikkara Namboorimaar
 7. Kaaraattu Namboori
 8. Viddi! Kushmaandam
 9. Kunchan Nambiaarudaey Ulbhavam
 10. Valiya Parisha Shankaranaaraayana Chaakyaar
 11. Aazhuvaanchery Thampraakkalum Mangalathhtu Shankaranum
 12. Naalaekkaattu Pillamaar
 13. Kayamkulam Kochunni
 14. Kaipuzha Raajniyum Pulinkunnu Desavum
 15. Orantharjanaththintaey yukthi
 16. Pazhur perumthrukkovil
 17. Paakkanaarudaey bhaaryayudaey paathivrathyam
 18. Randu Mahaaraajaakkanmaarudaey swabhaavavyathyaasam
 19. Kochchunamboori
 20. Chempakassery Raajaavum Maeppaththoor Bhattathiriyum
 21. Vattapparampil Valiyamma
 22. Vaikkaththu Thiruneelakantan

Book III 

 1. Kiliroorkunninmael Bhagavathi
 2. Poonthaanaththu Namboori
 3. Aalaththoor Nampi
 4. Vayaskara Chathurvedi Bhattathiriyum Yakshiyum
 5. Raamapuraththu Warrier
 6. Chemprayezhuththachchanmaar
 7. Kochchi Shakthanthampuraan Thirumanassukondu
 8. Ammannoor Parameshwara Chaakyaar
 9. Cheranalloor Kunchukkarthaavu
 10. Kottarakkara Goshaala
 11. Thaevalassery Nampi
 12. Chila eeshwaranmaarudaey pinakkam
 13. Parangottu Namboori
 14. Paakkil Shaasthaavu
 15. Kodungallur Vasoorimaala
 16. Thripoonithara kshethraththilaey ulsavangal
 17. Aaranmulamaahaathmyam
 18. Konniyil Kochchayappan
 19. Maanthrikanaaya Rawther

Book IV 

 1. Oorakaththu Ammathiruvadi
 2. Swathithirunal Mahaaraajaavuthirumanassukondu
 3. Pilaamanthol Mooss
 4. Shasthamkottayum Kuranganmaarum
 5. Mazhamangalaththu Namboori
 6. Vayaskarakkudumbavum aviduththaey Shaasthaavum
 7. Kaayamkulaththu Raajavintaey shreechakram
 8. Kulappuraththu Bheeman
 9. Mannadikkaavum Kampiththaanum
 10. Shreekrishnakarnaamrutham
 11. Kadamattathu Kathanar
 12. Puruharinapuraeshamaahaathmyam
 13. Tholakavi
 14. Kunchukuttippilla sarwaadhikaaryakkaar
 15. Achchankovilshaasthaavum Parivaaramoorththikalum
 16. Avanaamanakkal Gopalan

Book V

 1. Pallipuraththukaavu
 2. Elaedaththuthykkaattu Moossanmaar
 3. Kaipuzhathampaan
 4. Kollam Vishaarikkaavu
 5. Vayaskara Aaryan Narayananmooss avarkaludaey chikilsaanaipunyam
 6. Chamkroththamma
 7. Avanangaattu Panikkarum Chaaththanmaarum
 8. Kuttanchery Mooss
 9. Pallivaanapperumaalum Kiliroor Desavum
 10. Kaadaamkottu Maakkam Bhagavathi
 11. Oru europiyantheyantaey swamibhakthi
 12. Sanghakkali
 13. Kottarakkara Chandrashekharan

Book VI 

 1. Panayannaar kaavu
 2. Uthram Thirunaal Thirumanassukondum Kathakali yogavum
 3. Kaplingaattu Nambooriyum Deshamangalaththu Warrierum
 4. Vijayadri Maahaathmyam
 5. Naduvilaeppaattu Bhattathiri
 6. Aaranmula Devanum Mangaattu Bhattathiriyum
 7. Mundaempilly Krishna Maaraar
 8. Mannaarassaala Maahaathmyam
 9. Oru Swaamiyaarudaey shaapam
 10. Pullankoottu Namboori
 11. Panachchikkaattu Saraswathi
 12. Vellaadu Namboori
 13. Aaranmula Valiya Balakrishnan

Book VII 

 1. Chengannur Bhagawathi
 2. Edavettikkaatthu Namboori
 3. Payyannur graamam
 4. Olassayil Vaettakkorumakan kaavu
 5. Shabarimala Shaasthaavum Panthalaththu Raajaavum
 6. Vaikkaththaey Paattukal
 7. Perumpulaavil Kaelu Menon
 8. Chempakassery Raajaavum Raajniyum
 9. Vilwamangalaththu Swaamiyaar
 10. Paambummaekkaattu Namboori
 11. Kalidasan
 12. Panthalam Neelakantan

Book VIII 

 1. Chittoor Kaavil Bhagavathi
 2. Kalloor Namboorippaadanmaar
 3. Thakazhiyil Shaasthaavum aviduththaey ennayum
 4. Arackal Beebi
 5. Thiruvizhaa Mahaadevanum aviduththaey marunnum
 6. Pazhur perumthrukkovil
 7. Thekkedathu kudumbakkaar
 8. Mookkola Kshethrangal
 9. Kumaramangalathhtu Namboori
 10. Mandakkaattamanum kodayum
 11. Thiruvattattaadhi Kesavan

References

Kerala folklore
Asian mythology
Malayalam-language literature
Malayalam-language books